Flushing Community Schools is a school district in Flushing, Michigan, U.S.A.

The superintendent is Matthew Shanafelt.

Schools operated by the board include:
Early Childhood Center 	
Central Elementary School
Elms Elementary School
Seymour Elementary School 	
Springview Elementary School 
Flushing Middle School 
Flushing High School

The new Flushing Jr. High School was completed in 2005 and houses approximately 750 seventh and eighth grade students. Students in the middle school have access to a variety of technology labs to enhance their education. A physical science technology lab is available to all students for one semester as a part of the eighth grade physical science curriculum. A computer applications class is required of all students. A computer lab is available in the Library Media Center for student use for word processing, Internet and other computer applications. Also in place is an integrated learning lab for skill development in math and language arts and a mini-lab for foreign language instruction. Students have available to them core academic subjects and choices in exploratory electives with supporting technology. The middle school is fully accredited by North Central Association. The old Jr. High was built in 1927, and now is used for alternative education.

External links
Flushing Community Schools

School districts in Michigan
Education in Genesee County, Michigan
Flushing, Michigan